Trophon barnardi is a species of sea snail, a marine gastropod mollusk in the family Muricidae, the murex snails or rock snails.

Description
The shell can grow to be 10 mm.

Distribution
The geographic distribution includes South Africa and the Indian Ocean.

References

 Houart, R. (1987) Revision of the subfamily Trophoninae (Mollusca: Gastropoda: Muricidae) in Southern Africa, with description of four new species. Apex 2(2): 25-58.
 Houart, R.; Kilburn, R. N. & Marais, A. P. (2010). Muricidae. pp. 176-270, in: Marais A.P. & Seccombe A.D. (eds), Identification guide to the seashells of South Africa. Volume 1. Groenkloof: Centre for Molluscan Studies. 376 pp.

Gastropods described in 1987
Trophon